Sharp is an English language  surname, cognate to the German . It is also akin to words which have the sense of scraping, e.g. Latin  'ditch', Russian  'to scrape'.

Recorded variations of the surname include Sharp, Sharpe, Shairp, Sharps and the diminutives Sharpin, Sharplin and Sharpling. It originates from a medieval nickname, with the derivation from the Old English word "scearp", meaning sharp and used to describe a "sharp or smart" person.

People bearing the surname Sharp

A
 Abraham Sharp (1651–1742), English schoolmaster, mathematician and astronomer
 Alan Sharp (1934–2013), Scottish author
 Alex Sharp (American actor) (1921–2008), American actor, stuntman and writer
 Anne Sharp (1916-2011), Scottish soprano
 Anthony Sharp (Quaker) (1643–1707), Dublin Quaker
 Anthony Sharp (1915–1984), English actor
 Archie Sharp (born 1995), British boxer
 Arthur Sharp (footballer)

B
 Bartholomew Sharp (c. 1650–1702), English buccaneer
 Billy Sharp (born 1986), English professional footballer
 Bree Sharp (born 1975), American singer and songwriter

C
 Cecil Sharp (1859–1924), English music teacher and traditional English dance expert
 Clifford Sharp, British journalist

D
 Dallas Lore Sharp (1870–1929), American nature author and university professor
 Dave Sharp (born 1959), English guitarist
 David Sharp (entomologist) (1840–1922), English physician and entomologist
 David Sharp (mountaineer) (1972–2006), Everest mountain climber
 Dee Dee Sharp (born 1945), American rhythm and blues singer
 Dennis Sharp (1933-2010), British architect
 Derrick Sharp (born 1971), American-Israeli professional basketball player
 Don Sharp (1922-2011), British film director
 Dorothea Sharp (1874–1955), British artist
 Dudley C. Sharp (1905–1987), former Secretary of the United States Air Force

E
 Elliott Sharp (born 1951), American avant-garde musician

F
 Frank Sharp (disambiguation)

G
 Gene Sharp (1928–2018), political scientist
 George Sharp (footballer)
 Graeme Sharp (born 1960), Scottish footballer
 Granville Sharp (1735–1813), English abolitionist

H
 Hap Sharp (1928–1993), American Formula One driver
 Harry Sharp (disambiguation)

I
 Isaac Sharp (1681–1735), early New Jersey settler, judge, politician, and colonel
 Isadore Sharp (born 1931), Canadian businessman

J
 Jack Sharp (1878–1938), English international footballer and test cricketer
 James E. Sharp (born 1940), American lawyer
 James Sharp (bishop) (1613–1679), Scottish clergyman
 James Sharp (footballer, born 1869), Scottish footballer
 James Sharp (footballer, born 1894), Scottish footballer
 James Sharp (footballer, born 1976), English footballer
 John Sharp (actor) (1920–1992), British television actor
 John Sharp (Archbishop of York) (1643–1714), Archbishop of York
 John Sharp (Australian politician) (born 1954), Australian politician
 John Sharp (Texas politician) (born 1950),  a former Texas politician
 Jon Sharp, former head coach of Huddersfield Giants
 Jonathan Sharp (1964-2009), English record producer
 Joseph Henry Sharp (1859–1953), artist (Taos Art Colony)
 Joseph Sharp (c. 1709–1776), early settler of New Jersey
 J. W. Sharp (c. 1818–1856), English comic entertainer

K
 K. B. Sharp (born 1981), professional women's basketball player
Katharine Dooris Sharp (1846–1935), American botanist and poet
Kevin Sharp (1970–2014), American country music artist
 Kevin Sharp (footballer) (born 1974), Canadian-born footballer
 Kevin Sharp (heavy metal), American heavy metal singer for Venomous Concept and Brutal Truth

L
 Leonard Sharp (1890–1958), British actor
 Lesley Sharp (born 1964), English actress
 Lester W. Sharp (1887–1961), American botanist
 Liam Sharp (born 1968), British comic book artist
 Linda K. Sharp, women's basketball coach
 Lindsay Sharp, museum director

M
 Maia Sharp, country music singer and songwriter
 Margaret Sharp, Baroness Sharp of Guildford (born 1938), member of the British House of Lords
 Margery Sharp (1905–1991), English writer
 Martha Sharp (1905–1999), American philanthropist
 Martin Sharp (journalist) (1847–1910), English historian
 Martin Sharp (born 1944), Australian cartoonist, songwriter and film-maker
 Matt Sharp (born 1969), American rock bassist
 Minnie Bell Sharp (1865–1937), pianist and singer
 Mitchell Sharp (1911–2004), Canadian politician

N
 Norma Sharp (born 1943), American operatic soprano
 Norm Sharp (born 1934), AFL 1952 premiership player

P
 Pat Sharp (born 1961), British television presenter
 Patrick Sharp (born 1981), Canadian ice hockey centre
 Peter Sharp, Australian rugby league footballer and coach
 Philip Sharp (disambiguation), multiple people
 Phillip Allen Sharp (born 1944), American geneticist and molecular biologist

R
 Randy Sharp, songwriter
 Ray Sharp (born 1969), Scottish footballer
Ray Sharp (badminton), Badminton player and medallist in 1970 British Commonwealth Games
 Rhod Sharp (born 1953), Scottish-born broadcaster
 Richard Sharp (politician) known as Conversation Sharp, English wit
 Richard Sharp (rugby union) (born 1938), English rugby player
 Rodney Sharp a director of the DuPont corporation
 Ronald Sharp (born 1929), Australian organ builder
 Ryan Sharp (born 1979), British race car driver

S
 Samuel Sharp (disambiguation)
 Scott Sharp (born 1968), an American race car driver
 Solomon P. Sharp (1787–1825), American politician
 Steve Sharp (disambiguation)
 Susie Sharp (1907–1996), American jurist
 Sylver Logan Sharp, vocalist

T
 Terri Sharp (born 1950), American singer
 Thomas Sharp (priest) (1693–1758), English churchman (Archdeacon of Northumberland), biographer and theological writer
 Thomas C. Sharp (1818-1894), opponent of Joseph Smith, Jr. and the Latter Day Saints
 Thomas Wilfred Sharp (1901–1978), English town planner and author
 Timm Sharp (born 1978), American actor
 Tom Sharp (cricketer), English first-class cricketer for Cornwall CCC and Unicorns

V
 Verity Sharp (born 1970), BBC Radio Three presenter

W
 Waitstill Sharp (1902–1984), American Unitarian minister and humanitarian
 Walter Benona Sharp (1870–1912), American oil drilling pioneer, innovator and philanthropist
 Wanda Sharp (born 1950), American politician
 Wilf Sharp (1907–1981), English footballer with Airdrieonians and Sheffield Wednesday
 William Graves Sharp (1859-1922), American lawyer, Congressman and diplomat
 William Sharp (engraver) (1749–1824), English engraver
 William Sharp (writer) (1855–1905), Scottish author and poet, pseudonym Fiona MacLeod
 Willie Sharp (1922–1992), Scottish footballer
 Willoughby Sharp (1936–2008), artist

Z
 Zerna Sharp (1889–1981), American teacher

Fictional characters
Becky Sharp, protagonist of Vanity Fair (novel), William Makepeace Thackeray's novel
Deryn Sharp, in Leviathan, a Scott Westerfeld novel
Gavin Sharp, in the soap opera EastEnders
John Sharp, the player character in the 2011 video game Cabela's Big Game Hunter 2012
Phineas Sharp, a villain in the Disney animated series Darkwing Duck

See also 
 General Sharp (disambiguation)
 Justice Sharp (disambiguation)
 Senator Sharp (disambiguation)
 Sharp (disambiguation)
 Sharpe (surname)
 Shairp
 Scharf, Scharff

References

English-language surnames

fr:Sharp
ko:샤프 (동음이의)
it:SHARP
he:שארפ
ka:დიეზი
th:ชาร์ป (แก้ความกำกวม)